Unsaved may refer to:

The Unsaved, a Moldovan drama film
Unsaved, the second album released by American industrial metal band Deadstar Assembly

See also
 Salvation
 Saved game